The STOXX Europe 50 is a stock index of European stocks designed by STOXX Ltd., an index provider owned by Deutsche Börse Group and SIX Group.
The index was introduced in February 1998.

The STOXX Europe 50 index provides a blue-chip representation of supersector leaders in Europe covering almost 50% of the free-float market capitalization of the European stock market. The index covers 50 stocks from 18 European countries: Austria, Belgium, Czech Republic, Denmark, Finland, France, Germany, Greece, Ireland, Italy, Luxembourg, the Netherlands, Norway, Portugal, Spain, Sweden, Switzerland, and the United Kingdom.

The index is weighted quarterly according to free-float market capitalization with components capped at a maximum of 10% and is reviewed annually in September.

It is licensed to financial institutions to serve as underlying for a wide range of investment products such as exchange-traded funds (ETFs), futures, options, and structured products worldwide.

Versions excluding the financial services industry or the banking sector respectively are also available.

See also

 EURO STOXX 50, a similar index limited to the Eurozone
 STOXX Europe 600, a similar index covering approximately 90% of the free-float market capitalization of the European stock market
 S&P Europe 350
 FTSE Developed Europe Index

External links
 STOXX page
Reuters page for .STOXX50
 Boerse Frankfurt page for STOXX Europe 50

Pan-European stock market indices